Marracci may refer to:

Ludovico Marracci (1612–1700), Italian oriental scholar and professor of Arabic
Giovanni Marracci (1637–1704), Italian baroque painter

See also
Carmelita Maracci